This article shows the rosters of all participating teams at the 2019 Asian Women's Club Volleyball Championship in Tianjin, China.

Pool A

Tianjin Bohaibank

Altay VC
The following is the roster of the Kazakhstani club  Altay VC in the 2019 Asian Club Championship.
Head coach:  Iurii Panchenko

Hong Kong

Chinese Taipei

Pool B

Supreme Chonburi
The following is the roster of the Thai club  Supreme Chonburi in the 2019 Asian Club Championship.
Head coach:  Nataphon Srisamutnak

Hisamitsu Springs
The following is the roster of the Japanese club Hisamitsu Springs in the 2019 Asian Club Championship.
Head coach:   Shingo Sakai

VTV Bình Điền Long An
The following is the roster of the Vietnamese club VTV Bình Điền Long An in the 2019 Asian Club Championship.
Head coach:   Nguyễn Quốc Vũ

April 25 Sports Club

Sri Lanka Air Force

Binagar

Asian Women's Club Volleyball Championship squads